George Morley (1598–1684) was an English Anglican bishop.

George Morley may also refer to:
 George Morley (MP) (1664–1711), English politician, MP for Hindon
 George Morley (1790–1852), founder of Morley Harps
 George Morley (police officer) (1873–1942), British police officer
 George Henry Morley (1907–1971), British military doctor and plastic surgeon